Racine is a quartier of Casablanca, Morocco.

Neighbourhoods of Casablanca